Spike Slawson is an American punk rock musician, a member of Me First and the Gimme Gimmes, Swingin' Utters, Filthy Thievin' Bastards, Re-Volts, and Uke-Hunt.

Early life
Having grown up in Pittsburgh, Slawson worked in the mail order department of the record label Fat Wreck Chords (which is the subject of a song by The Aquabats titled "Dear Spike").

Musical career

He later was in Me First and the Gimme Gimmes (a cover band/'supergroup' consisting mainly of members of Fat Wreck bands) formed in 1995. Slawson is the lead singer for the group. From 1997 to 2012, he was the bassist for Swingin' Utters. He also plays bass in Filthy Thieving Bastards, sings and plays bass for the Re-Volts, and more recently sings and plays ukulele for Uke-Hunt.

Discography

With Me First and the Gimme Gimmes

 Have a Ball (1997)
 Are a Drag (1999)
 Blow in the Wind (2001)
 Take a Break (2003)
 Ruin Jonny's Bar Mitzvah (2004)
 Love Their Country (2006)
 Have Another Ball (2008)
 Go Down Under (2011)
 Sing in Japanese (2011)
 Are We Not Men? We Are Diva! (2014)

With Swingin' Utters
Five Lessons Learned (1998)
BYO Split Series Volume II (1999)
Brazen Head E.P. (1999)
Teen Idol Eyes (1999)
Swingin' Utters (2000)
Fat Club (2001)
Dead Flowers, Bottles, Bluegrass, and Bones (2003)
Live in a Dive (2004)
Hatest Grits: B-Sides and Bullshit (2008)
Brand New Lungs (2010)
"Taking The Long Way" (2010)
Here, Under Protest (2011)
The Librarians Are Hiding Something (2012)
Stuck in a Circle - 2013

With Filthy Thieving Bastards
Our Fathers Sent Us (2000)
A Melody of Retreads and Broken Quills (2001)
My Pappy Was a Pistol (2005)
I'm A Son of a Gun (2007)

With Re-Volts
 Re-Volts (2007)

With Uke Hunt
"The Prettiest Star" (2014)
Uke-Hunt (2014)

Other appearances
 The Dwarves – The Dwarves Are Young and Good Looking (1997)
 NOFX – So Long and Thanks for All the Shoes (1997)
 No Use for a Name – Making Friends (1997)
 NOFX – The Decline (1999)
 No Use for a Name – More Betterness! (1999)
 The Dwarves – Come Clean (2000)
 The Dwarves – "Way Out!" (2000)
 NOFX – Pump Up the Valuum (2000)
 The Real McKenzies – Oot & Aboot (2003)
 The Dwarves – "Salt Lake City" (2004)
 Lagwagon – Resolve (2005)
 Punk Rock Karaoke – Punk Rock Karaoke (2008)
 NOFX – Coaster (2009)
 NOFX – Cokie the Clown (2009)
 The Dwarves – Dwarves (2011)
 NOFX – Self Entitled (2012)
 NOFX – "Xmas Has Been X'ed/New Year's Revolution" (2009)

References

External links
Interview, Truepunk.com 
Interview, Thepunksite.com 
Interview, Now magazine, November 30, 2006: "Gimme country: Punk cover cut-ups take on Nashville"

20th-century births
Living people
American punk rock singers
American male singers
Musicians from Pittsburgh
Me First and the Gimme Gimmes members
Singers from Pennsylvania
20th-century American guitarists
Swingin' Utters members
Filthy Thieving Bastards members
American male bass guitarists
Year of birth missing (living people)